Richard L. Dale (September 14, 1926 – March 16, 2019) was an American singer and musician, best known as a featured singer and saxophone player on the television variety show The Lawrence Welk Show.

A native of Algona, Iowa, he served in the United States Navy during World War II after graduation from Algona High School. His entertainment career began when he worked for several bands such as Harold Loeffelmacher and his Six Fat Dutchmen polka band. He was discovered by Lawrence Welk in 1951.

During his tenure on The Lawrence Welk Show, in addition to playing the saxophone, Dale sang not just solos but also in duets, performed in comedy sketches, dances, and also played Santa Claus for many years on the Christmas shows. Even after the show ended when its host went into retirement in 1982, he continued to perform with his fellow Welk alumni. From 1990 to 1996, he co-owned and operated the Rainbow Music Theater in Pigeon Forge, Tennessee, with fellow Welk star Ava Barber.

He married his wife, Marguerite, in 1949, and they had four children. After making their home in Sparks, Nevada, for several years, the Dales moved back to his hometown of Algona, Iowa in 2006. He died there in 2014.

References

1926 births
2014 deaths
American saxophonists
American male saxophonists
American male singers
American television personalities
People from Algona, Iowa
Singers from Iowa
Lawrence Welk
20th-century saxophonists
United States Navy personnel of World War II